Central Chambers may refer to:

 Central Chambers (Ottawa), a building in Ottawa, Canada
 Central Chambers (Fremantle), a building in Fremantle, Western Australia
 Central Chambers, a 2008 music album by Winterpills